Villamartín is a city located in the province of Cádiz, Spain. According to the 2005 census, the city has a population of 12,145 inhabitants. It is location of Castle of Matrera.

Demographics

External links 

Villamartín - Sistema de Información Multiterritorial de Andalucía
Panorámicas de Villamartín - Panorámicas de Villamartín

Municipalities of the Province of Cádiz